Gordon of Ghost City is a 1933 Pre-Code Universal movie serial based on the novel Oh, Promise Me! by Peter B. Kyne, directed by Ray Taylor and starring Buck Jones and Madge Bellamy.

Plot
Buck Gordon is hired to discover who has been rustling a rancher's cattle, while simultaneously trying to protect a young girl (Madge Bellamy) and her prospector grandfather (Tom Ricketts) from having their newly discovered gold mine stolen from them by a mystery villain.

Cast
Buck Jones as Buck Gordon
Madge Bellamy as Mary Gray
Walter Miller as Rance Radigan
Tom Ricketts as Amos Gray
William Desmond as John Mulford
Francis Ford as The Mystery Man
Edmund Cobb as Cowhand Scotty
Craig Reynolds as Henchman Ed (as Hugh Enfield)
Bud Osborne as Henchman Hank (as Bud Osbourne)
Ethan Laidlaw as Henchman Pete

Chapter titles
A Lone Hand
The Stampede
Trapped
The Man of Mystery
Riding for Life
Blazing Prairies
Entombed in the Tunnel
The Thundering Herd
Flames of Fury
Swimming in the Torrent
A Wild Ride
Mystery of Ghost City
Source:

Home Entertainment
On May 12, 2020, the entire serial was released on Region 1 DVD and Blu-Ray by VCI Entertainment. Universal licensed the rights and granted them access to the original 35mm elements.

See also
List of film serials by year
List of film serials by studio

References

External links

1933 Western (genre) films
American black-and-white films
Films based on American novels
Films based on Western (genre) novels
Universal Pictures film serials
Films directed by Ray Taylor
American Western (genre) films
Films set in ghost towns
1930s English-language films
Films with screenplays by George H. Plympton
1930s American films